Ishizaki (written: 石崎 lit. "stone peninsula") is a Japanese surname. Notable people with the surname include:

, Japanese politician
, Japanese anime creator, producer and screenwriter
, Japanese footballer and manager
Stefan Ishizaki (born 1982), Swedish footballer
Takashi Ishizaki, Japanese mixed martial artist
, Japanese basketball player
, Japanese baseball player

See also
8163 Ishizaki, a main-belt asteroid
Iwasaki

Japanese-language surnames